Anacamptodes is a genus of moths in the family Geometridae erected by James Halliday McDunnough in 1920. There are around 40 species within the genus, although a number have been reassigned to the genus Iridopsis.

Species
 Anacamptodes angulata Rindge, 1966
 Anacamptodes cerasta Rindge, 1966
 Anacamptodes clivinaria Guenée, 1858
 Anacamptodes cypressaria Grossbeck, 1917
 Anacamptodes dataria Grote, 1882
 Anacamptodes defectaria Guenée, 1857 (syn: Anacamptodes albigenaria Walker, 1860)
 Anacamptodes emida Schaus
 Anacamptodes encarsia Rindge, 1966
 Anacamptodes ephyraria Walker, 1860
 Anacamptodes expressaria Walker, 1862
 Anacamptodes fragilaria Grossbeck, 1909
 Anacamptodes fragillaria Barnes & McDunnough, 1912
 Anacamptodes gemella Rindge, 1966
 Anacamptodes herse Schaus, 1912
 Anacamptodes humaria Packard, 1876
 Anacamptodes illaudata Walker, 1860
 Anacamptodes illaudatum Dyar, 1902
 Anacamptodes impia Rindge, 1966
 Anacamptodes intractaria Walker, 1860
 Anacamptodes intraria Guenée, 1857
 Anacamptodes jacumbaria Dyar, 1908
 Anacamptodes larvaria Saunders, 1874
 Anacamptodes lurida Schaus, 1918
 Anacamptodes monticola Rindge, 1966
 Anacamptodes obliquaria Grote, 1883
 Anacamptodes pallida Rindge, 1966
 Anacamptodes perfectaria McDunnough, 1940
 Anacamptodes pergracilis Hulst, 1900
 Anacamptodes profanata Barnes & McDunnough, 1916
 Anacamptodes providentia Rindge, 1966
 Anacamptodes pseudoherse Rindge, 1966
 Anacamptodes rufaria Grote, 1883
 Anacamptodes sancta Rindge, 1966
 Anacamptodes sanctissima Barnes & McDunnough, 1916
 Anacamptodes takenaria Pearsall, 1909
 Anacamptodes tethe Rindge, 1966
 Anacamptodes triplicia Rindge, 1966
 Anacamptodes vellivolata Hulst, 1887

References

External links
 "Anacamptodes McDunnough 1920". Encyclopaedia of Life.

Boarmiini
Geometridae genera